The 2011 Vengeance was the eighth Vengeance professional wrestling pay-per-view (PPV) event produced by WWE. It took place on October 23, 2011, at the AT&T Center in San Antonio, Texas. It was the first Vengeance held since 2007 and also the last until 2021 when Vengeance was rebranded as an NXT TakeOver event titled Vengeance Day. The 2011 Vengeance replaced Bragging Rights. Vengeance was dropped the following year in favor of only holding one PPV during October, Hell in a Cell. The event garnered 121,000 buys, down from 137,000 buys the previous year's Bragging Rights. 

Nine matches were contested at the event, including one on the pre-show. In the main event, Alberto Del Rio defeated John Cena in a last man standing match to retain the WWE Championship. In other prominent matches, World Heavyweight Champion Mark Henry fought Big Show to a no contest, Randy Orton defeated WWE Intercontinental Champion Cody Rhodes in a non-title match and The Awesome Truth (The Miz and R-Truth) defeated CM Punk and Triple H.

Production

Background
Vengeance was an annual pay-per-view (PPV) event produced by WWE from 2001 to 2007. From that inaugural event until 2006, it was promoted solely as Vengeance, but in 2007, WWE promoted Vengeance as a joint PPV titled Vengeance: Night of Champions, which was both the seventh Vengeance event and the inaugural Night of Champions event. The 2007 event was the final Vengeance event as WWE dropped Vengeance in 2008 in favor of continuing Night of Champions. In April 2011, the promotion ceased going by its full name of World Wrestling Entertainment, with "WWE" becoming an orphaned initialism. Later that same year, WWE reinstated Vengeance—separate from Night of Champions—and scheduled it for the October slot in their PPV calendar, replacing Bragging Rights, which was two months after the end of the first brand extension. The eighth event in the Vengeance chronology, it was held on October 23, 2011, at the AT&T Center in San Antonio, Texas.

Storylines
Vengeance featured professional wrestling matches involving different wrestlers from pre-existing scripted feuds, plots, and storylines that developed on WWE's television programs, Raw and SmackDown. Wrestlers portrayed heroes or villains as they followed a series of events that built tension and culminated in a wrestling match or series of matches.

The main rivalry involved WWE Champion Alberto Del Rio against former champion John Cena for the WWE Championship. At Hell in a Cell earlier in the month, Cena lost his title to Del Rio after Cena was locked out of the steel cell while Del Rio pinned CM Punk in a Triple Threat Hell in a Cell match. A week later, recently instated Interim General Manager of Raw John Laurinaitis booked Cena's rematch against Del Rio for Vengeance. On the October 17 episode of Raw, Cena won a tag team match with Jim Ross to defeat Del Rio and Michael Cole and as per the pre-match stipulation, he chose the match at Vengeance to be a Last Man Standing Match.

Another rivalry was between CM Punk, Triple H, The Miz, and R-Truth. At Night of Champions, during the main event which was between the COO Triple H and Punk, Miz and Truth interfered and attacked both competitors. The following night on Raw, Triple H fired Miz and Truth. At Hell in a Cell, Miz and Truth attacked John Cena, CM Punk, Alberto Del Rio, the referee, and cameramen while the cell was still closed. The entire WWE roster came out to find a way into the cell. Eventually, they found pliers and got into the cell and Triple H attacked Miz and Truth. On the October 10 edition of Raw, Triple H was relieved from his duties of running Raw (though still COO) and Executive Vice President of Talent Relations John Laurinaitis was named Raw Interim General Manager and later that night made this match.

Another rivalry involved World Heavyweight Champion Mark Henry against Big Show for the World Heavyweight Championship. At Money in the Bank, Mark Henry injured The Big Show via a steel chair when Henry crushed the chair on Big Show's fibula keeping him out of action for roughly four months. Afterwards, Henry defeated Randy Orton at Night of Champions to claim the World Heavyweight Championship for the first time in his career, and defeated Orton once more at Hell in a Cell to retain his title. On the episode of SmackDown after Hell in a Cell, Big Show returned and began to attack Mark Henry demanding a title match for Henry's title. As Big Show was about to crush Henry's leg with a steel chair, SmackDown General Manager Theodore Long said that if Big Show did not crush Henry's leg, he would get his title match. Big Show decided to give Henry a chair shot to the back, fearing that if he crushed Mark's leg, he would not get his World Heavyweight Championship match.

Another rivalry involved Randy Orton and Intercontinental Champion Cody Rhodes. Earlier in the month at Hell in a Cell, Randy Orton lost his World Heavyweight Championship rematch in a Hell in a Cell match against Mark Henry, while Cody Rhodes brought back the classic Intercontinental Championship title belt and then successfully defended it in an impromptu match against John Morrison. Rhodes would cost Randy Orton another World Heavyweight Championship match on the October 7 edition of SmackDown. On the October 14 edition of SmackDown, Randy Orton would get vengeance against Rhodes when he picked up a pinfall victory over Rhodes. On the October 17 edition of Raw, Cody Rhodes picked up a pinfall victory over Orton after interference from Mark Henry. It was then announced that Randy Orton would face Rhodes at Vengeance in a non-title match.

The only rivalry on the Divas card was between Eve Torres and Beth Phoenix over the Divas Championship. On the October 17 edition of Raw, Torres was announced as the number one contender for the Divas Championship. On the following edition of Smackdown!, Torres interrupted Phoenix talking about the match, pushed her over and showed her 'ranty panties'. The same night of their match Kelly Kelly was being interviewed (because she is Eve's best friend) on a WWE.com exclusive but was attacked by Phoenix and Natalya but Torres saved her. Interim General Manager of Raw John Laurinaitis announced that Kelly Kelly and Natalya will be banned from ringside.

Event

Preliminary matches
The first match saw Air Boom (Evan Bourne and Kofi Kingston) defending the WWE Tag Team Championship against Dolph Ziggler & Jack Swagger. The match ended when Bourne pinned Ziggler after Air Bourne to retain the title.

Next, Dolph Ziggler defended the United States Championship against Zack Ryder. Air Boom were at ringside in the corner of Zack Ryder. Bourne and Kingston interfered by throwing Dolph Ziggler back in the ring when he went to the outside. Because of this, they were ejected from ringside. In the end, Ziggler pinned Ryder after a superkick.

After that, Eve challenged Beth Phoenix for the  Divas Championship with the stipulation of Kelly Kelly &  Natalya being banned from Ringside. Phoenix executed the Glam Slam on Eve and then pinned her for the victory.

Next, Christian faced Sheamus. The match came to an end after Christian tried to execute a Spear on Sheamus, who countered and executed a Brogue Kick on Christian to win the match.

In the fifth match, The Miz and R Truth faced Triple H and CM Punk. Triple H & Punk controlled the match until Kevin Nash attacked Triple H whilst the referee was distracted. Miz & Truth then executed a Shut Up/Skull Crushing Finale combination on Punk, with Miz pinning Punk to win the match. 

In the sixth match, Randy Orton fought Intercontinental Champion Cody Rhodes. At the end of the match, Rhodes executed Cross Rhodes on Orton for a near-fall. Rhodes attempted to execute an RKO on Orton, who countered into a Dropkick on Rhodes. Orton executed an RKO on Rhodes, pinning Rhodes to win the match. 

The penultimate match pitted the Big Show against Mark Henry for the World Heavyweight Championship. After Henry executed a superplex on Big Show, the ring collapsed, two rows of ropes fell, and one ring post jutted out. The referee ruled the match a No Contest. After the match, medical staff brought a stretcher out but neither Big Show nor Henry could fit on it. Then, a flatbed truck was driven to the ring, and the medical staff put Big Show on it. They drove away, but not before general managers John Laurinaitis and Theodore Long appeared. Then Henry was assisted out of the AT&T Center, at one point punching an EMT, and when he was gone, Laurinaitis said the main event would still be happening, despite the damaged ring.

Main event
The main event was a Last Man Standing match between John Cena and Alberto Del Rio for the WWE Championship, with the ring still in a collapsed state from the previous bout. Cena and Del Rio gained control over each other throughout the match. When Del Rio climbed the V on the stage, Cena threw him through a table. The Miz and R Truth attacked Cena, with Miz executing a Skull Crushing Finale on Cena and R-Truth executing a Shut Up on Cena. When Cena stood, Del Rio hit Cena with the WWE championship belt. Cena couldn't answer the ten count, and Del Rio retained the WWE Championship.

Aftermath
Following this event, WWE again discontinued Vengeance, this time until 2021—during this hiatus, the brand extension returned in 2016. In 2021, WWE revived the PPV for their NXT brand as a TakeOver event titled Vengeance Day, the name of which was also a play on its Valentine's Day scheduling.

Results

References

External links
Vengeance 2011 WWE Live Tour site
Vengeance 2011 on WWE.com

2011 in Texas
2011
Events in San Antonio
Professional wrestling in San Antonio
2011 WWE pay-per-view events
October 2011 events in the United States
es:WWE Vengeance#2011